Barringtonia reticulata is a plant in the family Lecythidaceae. The specific epithet reticulata means "like a network", referring to the leaf veins.

Description
The bark is grey.

Distribution and habitat
Barringtonia reticulata is native to the Andaman and Nicobar Islands, Peninsular Malaysia, Singapore, Sumatra, Borneo, Sulawesi and the Philippines. Its habitat is heath, swamp and beach forest.

References

reticulata
Flora of the Andaman Islands
Flora of the Nicobar Islands
Flora of Malesia
Plants described in 1851
Taxa named by Friedrich Anton Wilhelm Miquel